Allan McKellar (born 14 January 1967) is a former Australian rules footballer who played with Richmond and the Sydney Swans in the Victorian/Australian Football League (VFL/AFL).

McKellar spent five seasons playing with Richmond. He had his best year in 1989 when he was third at the club for disposals and their top vote getter in the Brownlow Medal, with 10 votes. In the 1991 Pre-Season Draft, McKellar was picked up by Footscray, with the 14th selection, but he wouldn't play a senior AFL game for the club. He made his way to Sydney in 1992 and made two appearances for the Swans in the 1992 AFL season.

References

External links
 
 

1967 births
Living people
Australian rules footballers from Victoria (Australia)
Richmond Football Club players
Sydney Swans players